Die Höchste Eisenbahn is a German band from Berlin, consisting amongst others of the singer-songwriters Francesco Wilking and Moritz Krämer.

History 
The Singer-Songwriter Francesco Wilking – singer of the band Tele (band) – and Moritz Krämer planned a joint gig in  Dresden. After more gigs they created the band project Die Höchste Eisenbahn. The name was chosen because Wilking liked the picture of a "train driving like on stilts". In colloquial German something being "höchste Eisenbahn" indicates that it is urgent.

For a tour in fall 2012 they were joined by musicians Max Schröder (Tomte (band), Olli Schulz) and Felix Weigt and they became part of the band. The first EP Unzufrieden was released on 14 September 2012 by Tapete Records. The debut album Schau in den Lauf, Hase was released on 8 November 2013. The second album Wer bringt mich jetzt zu den Anderen was released on 26 August 2016.

Current members

Discography 
Albums und EPs
 2012: Unzufrieden (EP)
 2013: Schau in den Lauf, Hase
 2016: Wer bringt mich jetzt zu den Anderen
 2019: Ich glaub dir alles
Singles
 2014: Raus aufs Land
 2016: Lisbeth
 2016: Blume

External links 
 Official webpage

References 

German pop music groups
German rock music groups
Musical groups from Berlin
Tapete Records artists